is a keyhole-shaped kofun burial mound located in the Isawa neighborhood of the city of Ōshū, Iwate in the Tōhoku region of northern Japan. It is significant in that it is the northernmost keyhole-shaped kofun yet discovered, and indicates the penetration of Kofun period culture into lands traditionally considered part of the Emishi cultural zone.

Overview
The tomb does not appear in any historical records and the name or rank of the person buried within is unknown. From the style of the mound and grave goods uncovered within, archaeologists have dated the kofun to the late 5th or early 6th century AD.

The kofun was excavated in 1935 and 1945, during which time a number of haniwa in the shapes of animals, people and buildings were discovered. The site received protection as an Iwate Prefectural Historic Site in 1957. During further excavations held from 1974-1975, more haniwa and the fukiishi stones which originally covered the tomb were uncovered. The site received further protection as a National Historic Site in 1985.

Total length: 43–45 meters
Circular Portion: 2-tier, 28 meter diameter x 4 meter height
Keyway Portion: 10 meter width in the north, tapering out to 15 meters in the south, 1.5 meter height

The site is about 15 minutes by car from JR East Tōhoku Main Line Mizusawa-Esashi Station.The artifacts uncovered in excavations are preserved at the Isawa Local History Museum.

See also

List of Historic Sites of Japan (Iwate)

References

External links

 Oshu City Tourist Information 
Cultural Heritage Online 

Kofun
History of Iwate Prefecture
Ōshū, Iwate
Historic Sites of Japan
Mutsu Province